The South African national under-18 rugby union team – often referred to as the South African Schools rugby union team – is the under-18 side of the South Africa national rugby union team.

The team is selected every year at the conclusion of the various rugby union youth weeks and are predominantly made up from players that played at the Under-18 Craven Week tournament for their respective sides.

Under-19 International Series

The South African Schools team doesn't formally participate in any competitions, but they do play matches against either local or international opposition. Since 2012, the South African Under-18 team hosted an International Series (until 2015 known as the Under-18 International Series, since 2016 as the Under-19 International Series), with teams from England, France, Italy and Wales regular competitors in the series. Matches in this series take place at various venues in the Western Cape region.

Head to Head

2012

South Africa's results in the 2012 Under-18 International Series were:

2013

South Africa's results in the 2013 Under-18 International Series were:

2014

South Africa's results in the 2014 Under-18 International Series were:

2015

The results for South Africa and South Africa 'A' in the 2015 Under-18 International Series were:

2016

The results for South Africa and South Africa 'A' in the 2016 Under-19 International Series were:

2017

The results for South Africa in the 2017 Under-19 International Series were:

2018

The results in the 2018 AON Under-19 International Series were:

2019

The results in the 2019 Under-18 International Series were:

Players

Current squad

The South African Schools squad was named for the 2019 Under-18 International Series against Argentina, England, France and Wales.

 Notes:

References

External links
 Official website of the South African Rugby Union

Rugby union